Taxila Tehsil, headquartered at Taxila, is one of the eight Tehsils (sub-divisions) of Rawalpindi District in the Punjab province of Pakistan. It is bordered on its north and west by Attock District, on its south by Rawalpindi Tehsil, on its southeast by Islamabad Capital Territory, and on its east by Haripur District, Khyber Pakhtunkhwa.

Historically, the area was part of the ancient region of Gandhara. Taxila contains the Taxila ruins, which were declared a UNESCO World Heritage Site in 1980.

Demographics
According to the 2017 census, the tehsil has a population of 677,951.

Administration
The tehsil of Taxila is administratively subdivided into 10 union councils: 
 Ghari Sikander
 Khurram Paracha
 Lab Thatoo
 Taxila Urban (3 Unions)
 Thatha Khalil
 Usman Khattar
 Wah
 Garhi Afghanan

See also
 Rawalpindi District
 Taxila

References

 
Tehsils of Rawalpindi District